The Florida Marlins' 1994 season was the second season for the Major League Baseball (MLB) franchise in the National League.  It would begin with the team attempting to improve on their season from 1993. Their manager was Rene Lachemann. They played home games at Joe Robbie Stadium. They finished with a record of 51-64, last in the National League East. The season ended early as a result of the 1994 players strike.

Offseason
 December 15, 1993: Mario Díaz was signed as a free agent with the Florida Marlins.
 December 20, 1993: Charlie Hough was signed as a free agent by the Marlins.
 December 20, 1993: Kerwin Moore was traded by the Marlins to the Oakland Athletics for Kurt Abbott.
 December 22, 1993: Mike Jeffcoat was signed as a free agent with the Florida Marlins.
 March 30, 1994: Mario Díaz was released by the Florida Marlins.

Regular season
By Friday, August 12, the Marlins had compiled a 51-64 record through 115 games. They had scored 468 runs (4.07 per game) and allowed 576 runs (5.01 per game).

Charlie Hough was 46 when he took the hill on Opening Day for the Marlins. He was the second oldest pitcher to pitch on opening day. Jack Quinn started for the Brooklyn Dodgers on Opening Day in 1931 at the age of 47.

Season standings

Record vs. opponents

1994 Opening Day lineup

Notable transactions
 April 3, 1994: Matt Turner was traded by the Marlins to the Cleveland Indians for Jeremy Hernandez.
 May 30, 1994: Mario Díaz was signed as a free agent with the Florida Marlins.
 June 2, 1994: Josh Booty was drafted by the Marlins in the 1st round (5th pick) of the 1994 Major League Baseball draft. Player signed July 14, 1994.
 June 27, 1994: Mike Jeffcoat was released by the Florida Marlins.

Roster

Player stats

Batting

Starters by position
Note: Pos = Position; G = Games played; AB = At bats; H = Hits; Avg. = Batting average; HR = Home runs; RBI = Runs batted in

Other batters
Note: G = Games played; AB = At bats; H = Hits; Avg. = Batting average; HR = Home runs; RBI = Runs batted in

Pitching

Starting pitchers 
Note: G = Games pitched; IP = Innings pitched; W = Wins; L = Losses; ERA = Earned run average; SO = Strikeouts

Other pitchers 
Note: G = Games pitched; IP = Innings pitched; W = Wins; L = Losses; ERA = Earned run average; SO = Strikeouts

Relief pitchers 
Note: G = Games pitched; W = Wins; L = Losses; SV = Saves; ERA = Earned run average; SO = Strikeouts

Farm system

References

External links
1994 Florida Marlins at Baseball Reference
1994 Florida Marlins at Baseball Almanac

Miami Marlins seasons
Florida Marlins season
Miami Marl